Priyanshu Khanduri (born 14 October 1995) is an Indian cricketer. He made his first-class debut for Himachal Pradesh in the 2017–18 Ranji Trophy on 6 October 2017. He made his List A debut for Himachal Pradesh in the 2017–18 Vijay Hazare Trophy on 15 February 2018.

References

External links
 

1995 births
Living people
Indian cricketers
Place of birth missing (living people)
Himachal Pradesh cricketers